The Căpuș is a left tributary of the river Someșul Mic in Romania. It discharges into the Someșul Mic in Gilău.

References

Rivers of Romania
Rivers of Cluj County